White Lion is a 2010 South African drama film directed by Michael Swan and starring John Kani.

Cast
John Kani
Thabo Malema
AJ Van der Merwe
Brendan Grealy
Jamie Bartlett

Release
The film premiered on 6 June 2010 at the Seattle International Film Festival.

Screen Media Films acquired North American distribution rights to the film on September that same year.

Reception
Lisa A. Goldstein of Common Sense Media awarded the film four stars out of five.

References

External links
 
 

South African drama films
2010 drama films
2010 films
2010s English-language films
English-language South African films